HSR Layout (Hosur-Sarjapur Road Layout) is a prominent suburb of South-Eastern Bangalore, India. The locality, initially developed by the Bangalore Development Authority in 1985 has now emerged into a coveted residential area due to its proximity to Electronic City, Sarjapur Road and the Outer Ring road on which I.T. Parks and other Special Economic Zones are located. Other prominent areas like Koramangala and BTM Layout are also easily accessible. Parks and modern civic amenities are some of the best maintained in the area. It lies in the Bommanahalli constituency of the Karnataka State Assembly. 

HSR Layout is divided into seven sectors which have main roads and cross roads. Main roads run north–south and Cross roads run east–west. Neighbouring localities of Agara, Parangipalya, Venkatapura, Somsundarapalya, Mangammanapalya and Hosapalya are also part of HSR Layout. Designed based on modern town planning principles, the layout has a centralized BDA Complex, which houses the city administrative offices and also other commercial establishments. Several educational institutions have also sprung up in the area, such as National Public School(kudlu), JSS Public School (established in 2004), Oxford College (founded in 1974) and the National Institute of Fashion Technology (NIFT) along with Networkers Home.

Location
The area is built on land reclaimed from Agara lake, is located between Hosur Road and Sarjapur Road. HSR Layout is about 7 km from Bangalore's other large residential area of Jayanagar, and 2 km from Koramangala.

Hospitals 
 Vowels 9M healthcare Private Limited  
 Sai Thunga Hospital Agara
Narayana Multispeciality Hospital
Greenview Medical Center - Multi Speciality Hospital Bangalore
Phoenix Hospital

Temples

Basaveshwara Gayathri Temple is located on 24th main road HSR layout.

Hospitals in HSR Layout 
HSR layout also has a number of Super Specialty Hospitals such as Narayana Multi Specialty Hospital, Green View Medical Center, Primus Hospital, Aspire Fertility Center, Lotus Multi Specialty Hospital, Spandhana Diagnostic Center, Shivakumar Medicals and General Stores, etc.

Parks 
HSR Layout is a home to several small and medium-sized parks which are actively maintained by BBMP. Few years ago, burning of dry leaves became a major problem here. By building a network of compost pits and getting BBMP on board, residents have put an end to the hazard of garbage.

HSR Layout also has one of its kind Composting Learning Center in Sector 4 - at one of its BBMP Parks. This learning center called Swachagraha Kalika Kendra has live models of community and home composting units. Volunteers of HSR Citizen Forum, an NGO working on sustainability initiatives(& main focus on solid waste) greet the visitors and explain to them about waste management. School & college students visit here for their field visit, and officials, apartments and many visitors from all parts of India and abroad have visit this learning center to learn to compost their kitchen waste. The park also has growing area - chemical free and pesticide free. The compost made in the Kedra is used to enrich the soil and grow greens and vegetables. This is the attractive area for the visitors. The Kendra also has 2 cows, and the cow dung is used to provide microbes for composting. So, Kalika Kendra is a completely sustainable learning center. The visitors here also are taught how to live in a sustainable manner, refusing-reducing-recycling-reusing dry waste, and use sustainable management of reject waste.

Schools 
A number of schools have opened up to serve HSR Layout's growing Student population - like National Public School (kudlu), Euro School HSR (Formerly Cambridge Public School), St. Lawrence School, Freedom International School, Mount Litera Zee School, Sri Chaitanya School, Vibgyor School, Narayana School, Sri Sri Ravishankar Vidya Mandir, and JSS Public School. There are also a few Montessori and pre-KG schools like Vivero International Pre-school & Day Care, Floretz Academy, Hive Preschool, KLAY Preschool and Daycare, Golden Arch Montessori. To serve students preparing for competitive examinations there are institutions like Allen, Aakash, FIIT JEE, Siri Shrine Academy and Rao's Academy.

Notes

Bengaluru Karnataka India

Neighbourhoods in Bangalore